Anonychomyrma longicapitata is a species of ant in the genus Anonychomyrma. Described by Donisthorpe in 1947, the species is endemic to New Guinea.

References

Anonychomyrma
Insects of New Guinea
Insects described in 1947
Taxa named by Horace Donisthorpe
Endemic fauna of New Guinea